St Michael's Antiochian Orthodox Church is a parish within the Antiochian Orthodox Archdiocese of Australia, New Zealand and the Philippines in South Dunedin, New Zealand. It was built in 1911 and was the first purpose-built Orthodox church in New Zealand. It is a Historic Place (Category II) of New Zealand (list number: 7341).

The exterior design of St Michael's is in simple Gothic Revival style while the interior is designed in Byzantine Eastern Orthodox style.

The church congregation includes about 50 families, many from Russia, Greece and Serbia.

References 

Churches in Dunedin
Eastern Orthodox church buildings in New Zealand
Greek Orthodox Church of Antioch
Greek Orthodox churches
Churches completed in 1911